Habitación Doble is the third studio album by American Latin pop duo Ha*Ash. The album was released on 1 August 2008 by Sony Music Latin. The album was recorded in Nashville, Tennessee, United States. Habitación Doble is a primarily a pop-rock and soft ballads album.

Three singles were released from the album. Its lead single "No Te Quiero Nada" peaked at six on the Billboard Latin Pop chart, and won an award from Cadena Dial. The following single "Lo Que Yo Sé de Ti" was released in October 2008 and "Tú y Yo Volvemos al Amor" launched in February 2009.

Background and production
The album was recorded in Nashville, Tennessee, United States. Ha*Ash described the album as more "pop-rock and soft ballads". Ha*Ash collaborated with Brandie Carlile on the song "Already Home", the first English song officially recorded by them.

Release and promotion 
Ha*Ash released three songs from the album starting with the single "No Te Quiero Nada". The other songs released were "Lo Que Yo Sé de Ti" and "Tú y Yo Volvemos al Amor".

Singles 

 "No Te Quiero Nada" ("I don't love you at all") was released as the album's lead single on 8 July 2008. It peaked at #6 on the Billboard Latin Pop chart. It won an award from Cadena Dial. It was nominated for Latin Pop Airplay Song of the Year, Duo or Group at the Billboard Latin Music Awards.
 "Lo Que Yo Sé de Ti"  was chosen as the album's second single, released on 24 November 2008.
 "Tú y Yo Volvemos al Amor" was released as the album's third single in February 2009.

Chart performance 
The album peaked at #6 in the Mexican album charts and #14 in the US Billboard Latin Pop Albums.

Critical reception

The album received mixed reviews from the critics.

Jason Birchmeier, from Allmusic, gave a mixed review, giving the album 3.5 out of 5 stars, saying:

Track listing

Credits and personnel 
Credits adapted from the liner notes of the Mexican edition of Habitación Doble.

Musicians

 Ashley Grace: vocals 
 Hanna Nicole: vocals , acoustic guitars 
 Brandi Carlile: 
 Aaron Sterling: drums 
 Jimmy Jhonson: bass 
 Dean Parks: acoustic guitars , electric guitar , mandoline , pedal steel 
 John Gilutin: keyboards 
 Bob Britt: electric guitar 
 Gary Lunn: bass 
 Kerry Marx: electric guitar , acoustic guitars 
 Brian Fullen: drums 
 Bob Patin: keyboards , synthesized 
 Scott Sanders: pedal Steel 
 Paul Furnance: acoustic guitars

Production

 Áureo Baqueiro: producer , arranger , vocals arrangements 
 Graeme Pleeth: producer , programming , mixing 
 Mauri Stern: producer 
 Gustavo Borner: recording engineer , mixing 
 Joseph Greco: recording assisting , guitar recording engineer 
 Nichoali Baxter: recording engineer 
 Francisco Ruiz: recording engineer 
 Jeef Balding: recording engineer 
 Jean Rodríguez: vocal director 
 Alejandro Jaén: vocal director 
 Guido Laris: vocal director 
 Justin Daniela: recording engineer 
 Robert Dante: voice editor 
 Martin Feveyar: recording 
 Jorge Fonseca: vocal director 
 Chris Gehringer: mastering

Design

 Paul Forat: A&R, executive Produced
 Maury Stern: A&R
 Lennie Díaz: A&R
 Charlie García: A&R
 Ricardo Calderón: album Artwork Photographer

Charts

Weekly charts

Year-end charts

Certifications

Release history

References

2008 albums
Ha*Ash albums
Spanish-language albums
Sony Music Latin albums